Vernon Township is an inactive township in Clark County, in the U.S. state of Missouri.

Vernon Township was established in 1868, taking its name Mount Vernon, the Virginia estate of George Washington.

References

Townships in Missouri
Townships in Clark County, Missouri